Ingrid Turković-Wendl (born Ingrid Wendl on 17 May 1940 in Vienna) is an Austrian retired figure skater, television announcer, and political figure. She has been an Austrian People's Party delegate to the National Council of Austria since 2002.

Turković-Wendl is a two-time European champion (1956, 1958), the 1956 Olympic bronze medalist in ladies' figure skating, and one of the youngest figure skating Olympic medalists. Among her contemporaries were fellow Austrians Hanna Eigel and Hanna Walter. Wendl later became a professional skater and performed in the Viennese Ice Revue (Vienna Ice Revue) and Ice Capades. She retired from the sport in 1971.

In 1972 she began working for ORF, the national Austrian public service broadcaster. She retired from broadcasting in 2000. Turković-Wendl was elected to the National Council of Austria in November 2002.

She is married to bassoonist Milan Turković.

Results

References

1940 births
Living people
Austrian female single skaters
Olympic bronze medalists for Austria
Figure skaters at the 1956 Winter Olympics
Olympic figure skaters of Austria
Figure skaters from Vienna
Olympic medalists in figure skating
World Figure Skating Championships medalists
European Figure Skating Championships medalists
Medalists at the 1956 Winter Olympics